Harry Melis (born 25 April 1957) is a Dutch former professional footballer who played as a winger. Melis played in the Eredivisie for Feyenoord, FC Den Haag and DS '79. He also spent a season in Belgian club football with Germinal Ekeren.

Harry's daughter Manon Melis also became a professional footballer and represented the Netherlands women's national football team.

References

External links 
 Profile at Feyenoord-Online.com

1957 births
Living people
Dutch footballers
Feyenoord players
Footballers from Rotterdam
Beerschot A.C. players
ADO Den Haag players
FC Dordrecht players
Association football wingers
Eredivisie players
Eerste Divisie players
Dutch expatriate footballers
Dutch expatriate sportspeople in Belgium
Expatriate footballers in Belgium